The Lemon Sisters is a 1990 American comedy-drama film from Miramax Films directed by Joyce Chopra and written by Jeremy Pikser. The film stars Diane Keaton, Carol Kane and Kathryn Grody. The film was both a commercial and critical failure after being shelved for more than a year with extensive revisions.

Plot
Three lifelong friends work the bars in 1980s Atlantic City performing the songs of the 1960s girl groups.

Principal cast

Critical reception
Caryn James of The New York Times hated the film:

References

External links 
 
 
 
 
 Original New York Times Review

1990 films
Films set in Atlantic City, New Jersey
Films set in New Jersey
Films directed by Joyce Chopra
Films scored by Howard Shore
1990 comedy-drama films
American comedy-drama films
Miramax films
Films about sisters
1990s English-language films
1990s American films